El Nuevo Herald is a newspaper published daily in Spanish in Southeast Florida, United States. Its headquarters is in Doral. El Nuevo Heralds sister paper is the Miami Herald, also produced by the McClatchy Company.

About el Nuevo HeraldFounded: First published in 1977 as El Miami Herald; expanded and relaunched in 1987 as el Nuevo Herald, available as a standalone newspaper in 1998.Key Executives: 
Nancy A. Meyer, President, Miami Herald Media Company 
Monica R. Richardson, Executive Editor Distinction: Award-winning, Spanish-language daily newspaper in the nation's third-largest Hispanic market.Circulation Area: Miami-Dade and Broward counties.Market: The South Florida market is the primary market in the state of Florida with nearly 4.3 million residents and ranks as the 15th largest in the United States. It is the third-largest Hispanic market in the nation.
Strength: 
Of daily newspapers, el Nuevo Herald is the United States' biggest Spanish-language Sunday paper (68,781) and the second-largest daily (53,924). El Nuevo Herald carries an extraordinary sphere of influence in Latin America and the Caribbean for its groundbreaking news. Customers: Hispanic readers in South Florida, the Caribbean and Latin America; web visitors from around the world.

 Awards 2002 Ortega y Gasset Journalism Award for best Spanish-language newspaper in the world
 Premio Rey de España—Journalism Award 2004 Maria Moors Cabot Prize
 Outstanding reporting on Latin America
 Premio Society for News Design
 Photography2005 GLADD National Awards for Outstanding newspaper articleNational Association of Hispanic Publications'''

 Best Hispanic Daily, 1990–99 and 2004-06
 Various Categories Awarded, 1990-2007

Government-paid journalists
On September 8, 2006, the publisher of the Miami Herald, Jesús Díaz Jr., fired three Nuevo Herald journalists – Pablo Alfonso, Wilfredo Cancio Isla and Olga Connor – because they freelanced for Radio/TV Marti, a U.S. Government news agency. Less than a month later, Díaz was instructed by his superiors at The McClatchy Company, the parent company of the Miami Herald and el Nuevo Herald, to re-hire the three journalists because they had prior approval to freelance for Radio/TV Marti from their supervisor at the time, el Nuevo Herald executive editor Humberto Castelló. Díaz resigned after reinstating the fired journalists.

See also

 Al Día El Día La Opinión La Voz de Houston''
 List of newspapers in Florida

References

Further reading
 Kent, Robert B. and Maura E. Huntz. "Spanish-Language Newspapers in the United States". Geographical Review, Vol. 86, No. 3, Latin American Geography. (1996), pp. 446–456.

External links
  
 

Hispanic and Latino American culture in Florida
Mass media in Miami
Newspapers published in Florida
McClatchy publications
Spanish-language newspapers published in Florida
Newspapers established in 1977
1977 establishments in Florida